The Penitent (1983) is a novel by Isaac Bashevis Singer (1902–1991). It was originally published in installments in The Jewish Daily Forward (1973) with the Yiddish title of Der Baal Tshuve. The English translation was made by Joseph Singer for Farrar Straus & Giroux. It tells the story of Joseph Shapiro, emigrating from Poland in 1939 and from USSR in 1945 to the United States in 1947, where he becomes rich and involved with consumism and lust, so that he decides to leave everything, including his job, his wife and his lover, and finally expatriate to Israel, where he wonders about the traditional values of Jewish culture.

Sources 
 Review on The New York Times by Harold Bloom

1973 American novels
Novels by Isaac Bashevis Singer
Novels first published in serial form
Works originally published in literary magazines
Repentance in Judaism
Farrar, Straus and Giroux books